Macna oppositalis is a species of snout moth in the genus Macna. It was described by Francis Walker in 1866. It found on Aru, New Guinea and the Raja Ampat Islands.

Subspecies
Macna oppositalis oppositalis
Macna oppositalis lutealis (Snellen, 1894) (Obi)

References

Moths described in 1866
Pyralini